Lance-Naik Islam-ud-Din  (1925 or 1926 – 12 April 1945) was a soldier of the British Indian Army during World War II, who was posthumously awarded the George Cross for sacrificing his own life to save others. He was serving in the 6th Battalion, 9th Jat Regiment, when on 12 April 1945 at Pyawbwe, central Burma, a live grenade went astray and threatened to cause a large number of casualties in his unit. Islam-ud-Din threw himself on the grenade at once, showing no hesitation. Saving the lives of his comrades, he was killed instantly, aged only 19 or 20 and leaving behind a widow in India. He was described as steadfastly courageous and a good leader by his superior officers after his death. He was gazetted on 5 October 1945.

References 

Indian recipients of the George Cross
Indian Army personnel killed in World War II
1945 deaths
1920s births
British Indian Army soldiers
Deaths by hand grenade